Mutazoids is a role-playing game published by Whit Productions Inc. in 1989.

Description
Mutazoids is a science-fantasy system set in 2073, sixty years after a weird plague mutated humanity into three types: Acceptables, only slightly deformed; Mutazoids, mutant monsters; and Supers, humans with super-powers.

Publication history
Mutazoids was first published by Whit Productions Inc. in 1989. Mutazoids was acquired by MT Enterprises (Moses Wildermuth and Stephen Lee) in 2002. The game was updated with Mutazoids 3e by Moses Wildermuth of MT Enterprises in 2003. Mutazoids is as of 2014 supported by FSC at http://Mutazoids.com

Reception
Stewart Wieck reviewed Mutazoids for White Wolf #20, rating it 3 out of 5 overall, and stated that "There is a lot of room for improvement in this game, and a long list of planned supplements may well do just that, but even now the game is a solid and certainly playable, RPG."

References

Role-playing games introduced in 1989
Science fantasy role-playing games